Typhoon Conson, known in the Philippines as Typhoon Basyang, was the second tropical cyclone during the 2010 Pacific typhoon season to impact the Philippines. Developing out of a tropical disturbance east of the Philippines on July 11, 2010, Conson quickly developed as it tracked nearly due west. Favorable environmental conditions, such as low wind shear and warm sea surface temperatures, allowed the system to intensify into a severe tropical storm by July 12. Around the same time, the JTWC assessed the storm to have been equivalent to a Category 1 hurricane. The following day, Conson struck Quezon Province with winds of  before weakening. After crossing the archipelago, the storm entered the South China Sea where it was able to re-strengthen. By July 16, Conson attained typhoon status as it neared the southern Chinese island of Hainan. The storm eventually made landfall near Ha Noi, Vietnam on July 17 and dissipated the following day.

In the Philippines, Conson produced widespread, torrential rains which triggered significant flooding. At least 76 people are known to have been killed across the country and 72 others are listed as missing. Preliminary damage estimates were placed at PHP189 million (US$4.1 million). In China, at least two people have been killed due to wind-related incidents. Hainan Province sustained significant damage from the typhoon, with damage estimated at ¥500 million (US$73.8 million). Widespread damage was reported in Vietnam where at least two people were killed and 17 others were listed as missing.

Meteorological history

Late on July 9, the Joint Typhoon Warning Center (JTWC), reported that a tropical disturbance had persisted within the vicinity of Yap island. Satellite imagery showed that the disturbance had a weak circulation which was stretching over Yap with disorganized convection. The disturbance was located to the south of a tropical upper tropospheric trough and was in an area of weak vertical windshear. During the next day, deep convection around the disturbance increased whilst a low to mid level circulation center appeared on satellite imagery. Early on July 11, the Japan Meteorological Agency (JMA) reported that the disturbance had intensified into a tropical depression, whilst the JTWC issued a Tropical Cyclone Formation Alert as the disturbance had consolidated and had multiple convective bands flowing into its low level circulation center.

During that afternoon the JTWC reported that the disturbance had intensified into Tropical Depression 03W and initiated advisories on the system, before reporting later that day due to favorable conditions it had intensified into a tropical storm. PAGASA also reported that afternoon that the disturbance had intensified into a depression and named it as Basyang. At 0000 UTC, the next day the JMA reported that Basyang had intensified into a weak tropical storm and assigned it the name Conson and the international designation of 1002.

Preparations

Philippines
Late on July 11, as they christened the tropical depression as Basyang, PAGASA placed the provinces of Cagayan, Isabela and Aurora under Storm Signal Number One, warning them to prepare for flash floods, landslides and strong winds. The next day, in addition to the signals already in force, PAGASA placed Quezon, Polillo Island, Camarines Norte and Catanduanes under Storm Signal Number One. Later that day, PAGASA placed the provinces of Catanduanes, Camarines Norte, Polillo Island, Aurora, Quirino and Isabela under Storm Signal Number Two while placing the provinces of Camarines Sur, Albay, Quezon, Rizal, Bulacan, Nueva Ecija, Nueva Vizcaya, Ifugao, Benguet, Mt. Province, Kalinga, Pampanga, Tarlac, Pangasinan, La Union, Abra, Ilocos Sur under Storm Signal Number One. On July 13, in the eyes of PAGASA, Conson had intensified into a typhoon. PAGASA made major revisions to the storm signals placing Catanduanes, Camarines Norte, Northern Quezon, Polillo Island and Aurora under Storm Signal Number Three. They also placed Camarines Sur, Laguna, Rizal, Bulacan, Nueva Ecija, Nueva Vizcaya, Quirino, Ifugao and Isabela under Storm Signal Number Two and Metro Manila, Albay, Marinduque, Batangas, Cavite, Bataan, Pampanga, Zambales, Tarlac, Pangasinan, La Union, Benguet, Mt. Province, Ilocos Sur, Kalinga, Apayao, Abra and Cagayan under Storm Signal Number One. After Conson had made landfall in Southern Luzon, PAGASA placed Metro Manila under Storm Signal Number Two. On July 14 at 1500 UTC, PAGASA lowered storm signals in all provinces.

Highest Public Storm Warning Signal

China
The Macau Weather Bureau placed Macau under the Standby Signal Number 1, late on July 14, before the Hong Kong Observatory also issued the Standby Signal Number 1, early the next day for Hong Kong. During the afternoon of July 15 the China Meteorological Agency issued a Yellow typhoon warning for parts of Hainan Province and the western Guangdong coast.

Prior to the storm's arrival, officials in Hainan and Guangdong provinces initiated large-scale evacuations. An estimated 40,000 and 20,000 were relocated in Hainan and Guangdong respectively.

Vietnam
Throughout northern Vietnam, officials urged residents living along coastal areas to evacuate inland. Fishermen were also told to return to port in order to avoid being caught in dangerous swells in the typhoon. A total of 18,371 people heeded the warnings and evacuated and 40,337 ships returned. Farmers were told to construct dikes around their crops in attempts to protect their fields.

Impact

Philippines
Within the Philippines, 102 people died and 46 people are listed as missing. Damage is estimated at  2010 PHP ( 2010 USD).

Telecommunications were also lost. Trees were uprooted, poles were strewn on the streets and rooftops were blown off. Classes from primary to college were suspended until July 14. NAIA recorded wind gusts of 95 km/h. At regional airports, air traffic officials canceled 29 international and local flights due to dangerous flying conditions brought about by the storm.
Elementary and pre-school classes for Metro Manila and affected provinces in Luzon canceled its classes before the afternoon of July 13. 15 Philippine Airlines flights from different airports were canceled due to heavy rain, gusty winds and near zero visibility. Roughly 500 passengers in Bicol and Quezon Province were stranded at their respective ports as the coast guard declared that ships may not depart due to high waves and heavy rains. Areas that had public storm signal warnings experienced high winds and torrential rains. Off the coast of Pandan, 20 fishermen went missing after their boats capsized amidst rough seas produced by the storm. By July 13, only one person had been rescued while the 19 others still remain missing. Near Bagamanoc, 11 other fishermen went missing due to similar incidents.

China

On July 16, Typhoon Conson brushed the southern coast of Hainan Province, resulting in substantial damage. At least two people were killed in the country after being struck by advertisement billboards in separate incidents. Trees also fell across the island causing significant structural damage on homes and businesses. The storm also ended a long dry spell affecting the island, leading to some seeing the storm as a positive event for the province. According to preliminary damage assessments, 544 homes were destroyed, 7,000 hectares (17,300 acres) of crops were lost and 572,326 people were affected. Monetary losses from the typhoon were estimated at ¥500 million (US$73.8 million), ¥120 million (US$17.7 million) of which was sustained Sanya alone.

Most of Sanya was left without power during Conson's passage as trees struck power lines and power poles were downed by high winds. Roads across the area became impassable due to fallen billboards, some reaching  in height, and trees. The sudden onset of destructive winds caught many people off-guard, stranding them along roadways. Within 15 minutes, the local police in the city were overwhelmed with calls from residents. Further away from the storm's center, moderate to heavy rainfall was reported in association with Conson's outer bands in Guangdong.

Vietnam and Laos
Off the coast of Vietnam, at least 13 fishermen were listed as missing after being caught in large swells produced by the storm. In Hai Phong City, 97 homes were damaged or destroyed and three people were injured. Along the coast of the Cát Hải District, Conson's storm surge inundated low-lying areas. As the storm moved inland, strong winds caused widespread power outages in Quảng Ninh Province. Roads and bridges in the area remained open; however, several motorcyclists were forced to stop driving and sit along the bridges as high winds made travel extremely dangerous. In the Tĩnh Gia District, one tourist drowned after being washed away by large swells at a beach house. Initial reports indicated that two others drowned; however, these were later proven incorrect. After the storm passed through, a second person, a child, was confirmed to have died during the storm. By the morning of July 18, 11 people were reported missing across the country. By July 24, reports throughout the country stated that 13 people were missing as a result of the storm.
Binh Bridge, a mayor bridge of Hai Phong was hit by three ships which were set loose by the typhoon. One ship, the Vinashin Orient, was stuck under the deck, damage it. The bridge was closed, await damage assessment.

After moving inland, the remnants of Conson brought heavy rainfall to parts of northern Laos.

Aftermath

Philippines

Conson was poorly forecasted by PAGASA. From July 12 to 13, Conson was forecasted to hit Aurora and Isabela provinces. But, at  PST (1500 UTC) on July 13 PAGASA changed its forecast from Isabela-Aurora landfall, to Quezon province landfall. However, residents living in those areas were not advised that the typhoon would hit their area and they also were not informed that public storm signal number 2 was raised. With this, severe damage ensued in the said areas. Later that same day, President Benigno Aquino III reprimanded PAGASA for failing to predict that Conson would pass over Manila.

China
Following the substantial damage in Sanya City, 1,000 police officers were deployed to keep order and ensure operations went smoothly. Fire and rescue teams relocated 200 people who were trapped in destroyed homes across the area.

Vietnam
Three vessels of the Vietnamese navy were sent to the region near the Paracel Islands to search for the trace of 27 fishermen which had been missing since July 17. 58 other fishermen were reported to have been previously rescued.

See also

Typhoon Rammasun
Tropical Storm Mirinae (2016)
Typhoon Vera (1983)
2010 South China floods
Typhoon Vamco (2020) – a Category 2 typhoon which had the same wind strength

Notes

References

External links

JMA General Information of Typhoon Conson (1002) from Digital Typhoon
The JMA's Best Track Data on Typhoon Conson (1002) 
The JMA's RSMC Best Track Data (Graphics) on Typhoon Conson (1002)
The JMA's RSMC Best Track Data (Text)
The JTWC's Best Track Data on Typhoon 03W (Conson)
03W.CONSON from the U.S. Naval Research Laboratory

2010 Pacific typhoon season
Typhoons
2010 disasters in the Philippines
Typhoons in the Philippines
Typhoons in China
Typhoons in Vietnam
2010 disasters in China
July 2010 events in Asia
2010 in Vietnam
Typhoons in Laos
2010 in Laos
Tropical cyclones in 2010
2010 disasters in Asia
2010 disasters in Vietnam